Rajiv Chilaka also known as Rajiv Chilakalapudi and Sitarama Rajiv Chilakalapudi is the founder and CEO of Hyderabad-based Green Gold Animations and the creator of a few cartoons including Krishna cartoon series and Chhota Bheem which has now been made into an animated series and films. For his work in presenting cartoons at affordable price, Chilika was conferred with an honorary doctorate of humane letters by the Academy of Art University, San Francisco in 2016. He was the recipient of the 2013 School of Computing and Engineering Alumni Achievement Award at the University of Missouri - Kansas City.

Early life
Chilaka went to Hyderabad Public School (The Hyderabad Public School, Ramanthapur). He received his BE in Electronics and Telecommunications engineering from Osmania University, Hyderabad in 1995 and went on to the University of Missouri - Kansas City for his master's degree in Computer Science.

Career
He started working as a software engineer in Kansas City for three years, but in 2000 he switched courses to study animation at the Academy of Art University, San Francisco. He has an elder brother, Srinivas Chilaka, who helps him in running Greengold.
Chilaka is the youngest son of noted technocrat Madhusudan Rao Chilaka and Ms. Chilaka.

Green Gold Animation
In January 2001, Chilaka set up Green Gold Animation Pvt Ltd. According to a report in the Indian newspaper, The Hindu it is now "perhaps the largest animation production company in India that caters primarily to children."

His first break came in 2004 with the animation series Bongo about an alien who lands on Earth. That led to Vikram Betal, an 80-minute 2D animation on the Cartoon Network in 2005. Chilaka and his team made a series of four animated telefilms on the life of Krishna for the Cartoon Network, before its sister channel Pogo agreed to air their next project Chhota Bheem in 2008. In various interviews Chilaka has shared that were it not for the windfall his company made from Bheem, he and his Greengold would still be in the 'hand to mouth' stage like hundreds perhaps even thousands of other animation companies. According to Chilaka, a few episodes into the telecast of Chhota Bheem, Pogo TV told him that due to the losses suffered the channel can no longer remain in air. But such was the great success in the very next episodes that Pogo continued with content. Chhota Bheem changed everything.

Chhota Bheem
Chilaka has told Wikipedia teams that he devised the concept of an Indian historically mythological hero, Chhota Bheem in 2005. During the first three years of the series Bheem was 'if not out-rightly presented at least allowed to be thought of' as a reincarnation of legendary warrior prince Bhima from Mahabharata but later on the concept itself was modified to make the village of Dholakpur and its inhabitants more contemporary showing episodes featuring things as disparate and modern as Bollywood, trains, air-crafts etc. to emphasise the change. The first episode aired on 6 April 2008. As of 2012, more than 130 episodes have been telecast in English, Hindi, Telugu and Tamil on the Pogo TV. These have been accompanied by more than 10 Chhota Bheem television movies also on Pogo. It has been ranked as the most popular television character among children of 2012 by Ormax Media's Small Wonders.

In 2012, the feature film Chhota Bheem and the Curse of Damyaan written by Richa Ingle Deo and Seeta was released. It is considered to be the first Indian home-grown TV series to be made into a feature film. By November 2012, the movie had grossed 50 million Rupees at the box office.

In January 2016, the feature film Chhota Bheem Himalayan Adventure written by Teja Pratap and Chilaka was released. The film was directed by Rajiv Chilaka and Rusauro B. Adorable.

On 10 May 2019, another feature film titled Chhota Bheem: Kung Fu Dhamaka was released. The film's music was composed by Sunidhi Chauhan and the film was distributed by Yash Raj Films. The film just like the previous ones was directed and produced by Rajiv Chilaka. This was the first film to be released in both 2D and 3D formats.

Related series
The following series have been created by Green Gold Animations

Merchandising and demographics
The merchandising accompanying the popularity of the Chhota Bheem series has produced a range over 500 products such as DVDs, T-shirts, bedsheets, ceiling fans which are available at 20 Green Gold Stores across India as well as on-line games, comics and carnivals.

Chilaka, who directs each episode of the TV series and directed the movie, claims "the show has worked across demographics" by not being tied to a specific location in India and "it's followed equally by boys and girls."

References

External links
 Green Gold Animation

Indian animators
Indian animated film directors
Indian animated film producers
Living people
Year of birth missing (living people)
Osmania University alumni
Businesspeople from Hyderabad, India
Green Gold Animation